A ferry is a ship, watercraft or amphibious vehicle used to carry passengers, and sometimes vehicles and cargo, across a body of water. A small passenger ferry with many stops, such as in Venice, Italy, is sometimes called a water bus or water taxi.

Ferries form a part of the public transport systems of many waterside cities and islands, allowing direct transit between points at a capital cost much lower than bridges or tunnels. Ship connections of much larger distances (such as over long distances in water bodies like the Mediterranean Sea) may also be called ferry services, and many carry vehicles.

History

In ancient times
The profession of the ferryman is embodied in Greek mythology in Charon, the boatman who transported souls across the River Styx to the Underworld.

Speculation that a pair of oxen propelled a ship having a water wheel can be found in 4th century Roman literature "Anonymus De Rebus Bellicis". Though impractical, there is no reason why it could not work and such a ferry, modified by using horses, was used in Lake Champlain in 19th-century America. See Experiment (horse powered boat).

In 1850 the roll-on roll-off (ro-ro) ferry, Leviathan designed to carry freight wagons efficiently across the Firth of Forth in Scotland started to operate between Granton, near Edinburgh, and Burntisland in Fife. The vessel design was highly innovative and the ability to move freight in great quantities and with minimal labour signalled the way ahead for sea-borne transport, converting the ro-ro ferry from an experimental and marginal ship type into one of central importance in the transport of goods and passengers.

In 1871, the world's first ferry ship was created in Istanbul. The iron steamship, named Suhulet (meaning ‘ease’ or ‘convenience’) was designed by the general manager of Şirket-i Hayriye (Bosporus Steam Navigation Company), Giritli Hüseyin Haki Bey and built by a British shipbuilder. It weighed 157 tons. It was capable of travelling up to 6 knots with the side wheel turned by its 450-horsepower, single-cylinder, two-cycle steam engine.

Launched in 1872, Suhulet's unique features consisted of a symmetrical entry and exit for horse carriages, along with a dual system of hatchways. The ferry operated on the Üsküdar-Kabataş route, which is still serviced by modern ferries today.

Notable services

Asia
In Hong Kong, Star Ferry carry passengers across Victoria Harbour. Other carriers ferry travellers between Hong Kong Island and outlying islands like Cheung Chau, Lantau Island and Lamma Island.

The Malaysian state of Penang is home to the oldest ferry service in the country. This service, now renamed Rapid Ferry, connects the Raja Tun Uda Ferry Terminal at Weld Quay in George Town on Penang Island with the Sultan Abdul Halim Ferry Terminal in Butterworth on Peninsular Malaysia. It has also become a tourist attraction among foreigners.

In the Philippines, the Philippine Nautical Highway System forms the backbone of the nationwide transport system by integrating ports with highway systems. The system has three main routes. Another known ferry service is the Pasig River Ferry Service, which is the only water-based transportation in Metro Manila. This system cruises the Pasig River.

India
India's ro-ro ferry service between Ghogha and Dahej was inaugurated by Prime Minister Narendra Modi on 22 October 2017. It is a part of the larger Sagar Mala project.

Water transport in Mumbai consists of ferries, hovercraft, and catamarans, operated by various government agencies as well as private entities. The Kerala State Water Transport Department (SWTD), operating under the Ministry of Transport, Government of Kerala, India regulates the inland navigation systems in the Indian state of Kerala and provides inland water transport facilities. It stands for catering to the passenger and cargo traffic needs of the inhabitants of the waterlogged areas of the Districts of Alappuzha, Kottayam, Kollam, Ernakulam, Kannur and Kasargode. SWTD ferry service is also one of the most affordable modes to enjoy the beauty of the scenic Kerala backwaters.

Russian Federation 

Due to the geographical features of Russia, it has a large number of both sea and river ferry crossings. First of all, these are car ferries from the continental part of Russia to Sakhalin, Kamchatka and Japan. The Ust-Luga - Kaliningrad ferry also runs, until February 2022 ferries also ran from St. Petersburg to different cities of the Baltic Sea. Before the construction of the Kerch Bridge, there was a ferry across the Kerch Strait, after the terrorist attack on the Kerch Bridge, the ferry was resumed.
There are also more than 100 ferry crossings on different rivers in Russia. These are usually symmetrical through ferries with two ramps for quick entry and exit of cars. For some categories of car owners, these ferries may be free if there is no alternative crossing of the river.

Europe
The busiest seaway in the world, the English Channel, connects Great Britain and mainland Europe, with ships sailing from the UK ports of Dover, Newhaven, Poole, Portsmouth and Plymouth to French ports, such as Calais, Dunkirk, Dieppe, Roscoff, Cherbourg-Octeville, Caen, St Malo and Le Havre. The busiest ferry route to France is the Dover to Calais crossing with approximately 9,168,000 passengers using the service in 2018. Ferries from Great Britain also sail to Belgium, the Netherlands, Norway, Spain and Ireland. Some ferries carry mainly tourist traffic, but most also carry freight, and some are exclusively for the use of freight lorries. In Britain, car-carrying ferries are sometimes referred to as RORO (roll-on, roll-off) for the ease by which vehicles can board and leave.

The busiest single ferry route in terms of the number of departures is across the northern part of Øresund, between Helsingborg, Scania, Sweden and Elsinore, Denmark. Before the Øresund bridge was opened in July 2000, car and "car and train" ferries departed up to seven times every hour (every 8.5 minutes). This has since been reduced, but a car ferry still departs from each harbor every 15 minutes during daytime. Today, all ferries on this route are constructed so that they do not need to turn around in the harbors. This also means that the ferries lack stems and sterns, since the vessels sail in both directions. Starboard and port-side are dynamic, depending on the direction the ferry sails. Despite the short crossing, the ferries are equipped with restaurants (on three out of four ferries), cafeterias, and kiosks. Passengers without cars often make a double or triple return journey in the restaurants; for this, a single journey ticket is sufficient. Passenger and bicycle passenger tickets are inexpensive compared with longer routes.

Large cruiseferries sail in the Baltic Sea between Finland, Åland, Sweden, Estonia, Latvia and Saint Petersburg, Russia and from Italy to Sardinia, Corsica, Spain and Greece. In many ways, these ferries are like cruise ships, but they can also carry hundreds of cars on car decks. Besides providing passenger and car transport across the sea, Baltic Sea cruise-ferries are a popular tourist destination unto themselves, with multiple restaurants, nightclubs, bars, shops and entertainment on board. Also many smaller ferries operate on domestic routes in Finland, Sweden and Estonia.

The south-west and southern parts of the Baltic Sea has several routes mainly for heavy traffic and cars. The ferry routes of Trelleborg-Rostock, Trelleborg-Travemünde, Trelleborg-Świnoujście, Gedser-Rostock, Gdynia-Karlskrona, and Ystad-Świnoujście are all typical transports ferries. On the longer of these routes, simple cabins are available. The Rødby-Puttgarden route also transports day passenger trains between Copenhagen and Hamburg, and on the Trelleborg-Sassnitz route, it also has capacities for the daily night trains between Berlin and Malmö.

In Istanbul, ferries connect the European and Asian shores of Bosphorus, as well as Princes' Islands and nearby coastal towns. In 2014, İDO transported 47 million passengers, the largest ferry system in the world.

The world's shortest ferry line is the Ferry Lina in Töreboda, Sweden. It takes around 20–25 seconds and is hand powered.

North America

Due to the numbers of large freshwater lakes and length of shoreline in Canada, various provinces and territories have ferry services.

BC Ferries operates the third largest ferry service in the world which carries travellers between Vancouver Island and the British Columbia mainland on the country's west coast. This ferry service operates to other islands including the Gulf Islands and Haida Gwaii. In 2015, BC Ferries carried more than 8 million vehicles and 20 million passengers. In Vancouver there is SeaBus.

Canada's east coast has been home to numerous inter- and intra-provincial ferry and coastal services, including a large network operated by the federal government under CN Marine and later Marine Atlantic. Private and publicly owned ferry operations in eastern Canada include Marine Atlantic, serving the island of Newfoundland, as well as Bay, NFL, CTMA, Coastal Transport, and STQ. Canadian waters in the Great Lakes once hosted numerous ferry services, but these have been reduced to those offered by Owen Sound Transportation and several smaller operations. There are also several commuter passenger ferry services operated in major cities, such as Metro Transit in Halifax, and Toronto Island ferries in Toronto. There is also the Société des traversiers du Québec.

Washington State Ferries operates the most extensive ferry system in the continental United States and the second largest in the world by vehicles carried, with ten routes on Puget Sound and the Strait of Juan de Fuca serving terminals in Washington and Vancouver Island. In 2016, Washington State Ferries carried 10.5 million vehicles and 24.2 million riders in total.

The Alaska Marine Highway System provides service between Bellingham, Washington and various towns and villages throughout Southeast and Southwest Alaska, including crossings of the Gulf of Alaska. AMHS provides affordable access to many small communities with no road connection or airport.

The Staten Island Ferry in New York City, sailing between the boroughs of Manhattan and Staten Island, is the nation's single busiest ferry route by passenger volume. Unlike riders on many other ferry services, Staten Island Ferry passengers do not pay any fare to ride it. New York City also has a network of smaller ferries, or water taxis, that shuttle commuters along the Hudson River from locations in New Jersey and Northern Manhattan down to the midtown, downtown and Wall Street business centers. Several ferry companies also offer service linking midtown and lower Manhattan with locations in the boroughs of Queens and Brooklyn, crossing the city's East River. New York City Mayor Bill de Blasio announced in February 2015 that city would begin an expanded Citywide Ferry Service, and launched as NYC Ferry in 2017, linking heretofore relatively isolated communities such as Manhattan's Lower East Side, Soundview in The Bronx, Astoria and the Rockaways in Queens and such Brooklyn neighborhoods as Bay Ridge, Sunset Park, and Red Hook with existing ferry landings in Lower Manhattan and Midtown Manhattan. There was a second expansion phase which connected Staten Island to the West Side of Manhattan, and added a stop in Throgs Neck, in the Bronx. NYC Ferry is now the largest passenger fleet in the United States.

The New Orleans area also has many ferries in operation that carry both vehicles and pedestrians. Most notable is the Algiers Ferry. This service has been in continuous operation since 1827 and is one of the oldest operating ferries in North America.
In New England, vehicle-carrying ferry services between mainland Cape Cod and the islands of Martha's Vineyard and Nantucket are operated by The Woods Hole, Martha's Vineyard and Nantucket Steamship Authority, which sails year-round between Woods Hole and Vineyard Haven as well as Hyannis and Nantucket. Seasonal service is also operated from Woods Hole to Oak Bluffs from Memorial Day to Labor Day. As there are no bridges or tunnels connecting the islands to the mainland, The Steamship Authority ferries in addition to being the only method for transporting private cars to or from the islands, also serves as the only link by which heavy freight and supplies such as food and gasoline can be trucked to the islands. Additionally, Hy-Line Cruises operates high speed catamaran service from Hyannis to both islands, as well as traditional ferries, and several smaller operations run seasonal passenger only service primarily geared towards tourist day-trippers from other mainland ports, including New Bedford, (New Bedford Fast Ferry) Falmouth, (Island Queen ferry and Falmouth Ferry) and Harwich (Freedom Cruise Line). Ferries also bring riders and vehicles across Long Island Sound to such Connecticut cities as Bridgeport and New London, and to Block Island in Rhode Island from points on Long Island.

Transbay commuting in the San Francisco Bay Area was primarily ferry based until the advent of automobiles in the 1940s and most bridges in the area were built to supplant ferry services. By the 1970s, ferries were primarily used by tourists with Golden Gate Ferry, an organization under the ownership as the same governing body as the Golden Gate Bridge, left as the sole commute operator. The 1989 Loma Prieta earthquake prompted restoration of service to the East Bay. The modern ferry network is primarily under the authority of San Francisco Bay Ferry, connecting with cities as far as Vallejo. Tourist excursions are also offered by Blue & Gold Fleet and Red & White Fleet. A ferry serves Angel Island (which also accepts private craft). Alcatraz is served exclusively by ferry service administered by the National Park Service.

Until the completion of the Mackinac Bridge in the 1950s, ferries were used for vehicle transportation between the Lower and the Upper Peninsulas of Michigan, across the Straits of Mackinac in the United States. Ferry service for bicycles and passengers continues across the straits for transport to Mackinac Island, where motorized vehicles are almost completely prohibited. This crossing is made possible by three ferry lines, Arnold Transit Company, Shepler's Ferry, and Star Line Ferry.

A ferry service runs between Milwaukee, Wisconsin and Muskegon, Michigan operated by Lake Express. Another ferry SS Badger operates between Manitowoc, Wisconsin and Ludington, Michigan. Both cross Lake Michigan.

Mexico has ferry services run by Baja Ferries that connect La Paz located on the Baja California Peninsula with Mazatlán and Topolobampo. Passenger ferries also run from Playa del Carmen to the island of Cozumel.

South America
There are several ferries in South America.

Chacao Channel has ferry lines.

Oceania

These run overnight but also include day crossings in peak time. Both ferries are based in the northern Tasmanian port city of Devonport and sail to Geelong. Before Geelong this ferry used to sail to Melbourne.

The double-ended Freshwater-class ferry cuts an iconic shape as it makes its way up and down Sydney Harbour New South Wales, Australia between Manly and Circular Quay

In New Zealand, ferries connect Wellington in the North Island with Picton in the South Island, linking New Zealand's two main islands.

Types
Ferry designs depend on the length of the route, the passenger or vehicle capacity required, speed requirements and the water conditions the craft must deal with.

Double-ended

Double-ended ferries have interchangeable bows and sterns, allowing them to shuttle back and forth between two terminals without having to turn around. Well-known double-ended ferry systems include the BC Ferries, the Staten Island Ferry, Washington State Ferries, Star Ferry, several ferries on the North Carolina Ferry System, and the Lake Champlain Transportation Company. Most Norwegian fjord and coastal ferries are double-ended vessels. All ferries from southern Prince Edward Island to the mainland of Canada were double-ended. This service was discontinued upon completion of the Confederation Bridge. Some ferries in Sydney, Australia and British Columbia are also double-ended. In 2008, BC Ferries launched the first of the Coastal-class ferries, which at the time were the world's largest double enders. These were surpassed as the world's largest double-enders when P&O Ferries launched their first double-ender, called the P&O Pioneer, which is due to enter service in September 2022.

Hydrofoil
Hydrofoils have the advantage of higher cruising speeds, succeeding hovercraft on some English Channel routes where the ferries now compete against the Eurotunnel and Eurostar trains that use the Channel Tunnel. Passenger-only hydrofoils also proved a practical, fast and relatively economical solution in the Canary Islands, but were recently replaced by faster catamaran "high speed" ferries that can carry cars. Their replacement by the larger craft is seen by critics as a retrograde step given that the new vessels use much more fuel and foster the inappropriate use of cars in islands already suffering from the impact of mass tourism.

Hovercraft

Hovercraft were developed in the 1960s and 1970s to carry cars. The largest was the massive SR.N4 which carried cars in its centre section with ramps at the bow and stern between England and France. The hovercraft was superseded by catamarans which are nearly as fast and are less affected by sea and weather conditions. Only one service now remains, a foot passenger service between Portsmouth and the Isle of Wight run by Hovertravel.

Catamaran

Since 1990 high speed catamarans have revolutionised ferry services, replacing hovercraft, hydrofoils and conventional monohull ferries. In the 1990s there were a variety of builders, but the industry has consolidated to two builders of large vehicular ferries between 60 and 120 metres. Incat of Hobart, Tasmania favours a Wave-piercing hull to deliver a smooth ride, while Austal of Perth, Western Australia builds ships based on SWATH designs. Both these companies also compete in the smaller river ferry industry with a number of other ship builders.

Stena Line once operated the largest catamarans in the world, the Stena HSS class, between the United Kingdom and Ireland. These waterjet-powered vessels, displaced 19,638 tonnes, accommodating 375 passenger cars and 1,500 passengers. Other examples of these super-size catamarans are found in the Condor Ferries fleet with the Condor Voyager and Rapide.

Roll-on/roll-off

Roll-on/roll-off ferries (RORO) are large conventional ferries named for the ease by which vehicles can board and leave.

Cruiseferry / RoPax 
A cruiseferry is a ship that combines the features of a cruise ship with a roll-on/roll-off ferry. They are also known as RoPax for their combined Roll on/Roll Off and passenger design.

Fast RoPax ferry

Pioneering this class of ferries was Attica Group, when it introduced Superfast I between Greece and Italy in 1995 through its subsidiary company Superfast Ferries. Cabins, if existent, are much smaller than those on cruise ships.

Turntable ferry

This type of ferry allows vehicles to load from the "side". The vehicle platform can be turned. When loading, the platform is turned sideways to allow sideways loading of vehicles. Then the platform is turned back, in line with the vessel, and the journey across water is made.

Pontoon ferry

Pontoon ferries carry vehicles across rivers and lakes and are widely used in less-developed countries with large rivers where the cost of bridge construction is prohibitive. One or more vehicles are carried on a pontoon with ramps at either end for vehicles to drive on and off. Cable ferries are usually pontoon ferries, but pontoon ferries on larger rivers are motorised and able to be steered independently like a boat.

Train ferry

A train ferry is a ship designed to carry railway vehicles. Typically, one level of the ship is fitted with railway tracks, and the vessel has a door at either or both of the front and rear to give access to the wharves.

Foot ferry
Foot ferries are small craft used to ferry foot passengers, and often also cyclists, over rivers. These are either self-propelled craft or cable ferries. Such ferries are for example to be found on the lower River Scheldt in Belgium and in particular the Netherlands. Regular foot ferry service also exists in the capital of the Czech Republic, Prague, and across the Yarra River in Melbourne, Australia at Newport. Restored, expanded ferry service in the Port of New York and New Jersey uses boats for pedestrians only.

Cable ferry

Very short distances may be crossed by a cable or chain ferry, which is usually a pontoon ferry (see above), where the ferry is propelled along and steered by cables connected to each shore. Sometimes the cable ferry is human powered by someone on the boat. Reaction ferries are cable ferries that use the perpendicular force of the current as a source of power. Examples of a current propelled ferry are the four Rhine ferries in Basel, Switzerland. Cable ferries may be used in fast-flowing rivers across short distances. With an ocean crossing of approximately 1900 metres, the cable ferry between Vancouver Island and Denman Island in British Columbia; is the longest one in the world.

Free ferries operate in some parts of the world, such as at Woolwich in London, England (across the River Thames); in Amsterdam, Netherlands (across the IJ waterway); along the Murray River in South Australia, and across many lakes in British Columbia. Many cable ferries operate on lakes and rivers in Canada, among them a cable ferry that charges a toll operates on the Rivière des Prairies between Laval-sur-le-Lac and Île Bizard in Quebec, Canada. In Finland there were 40 road ferries (cable ferries) in 2009, on lakes, rivers and on sea between islands.

Air ferries

In the 1950s and 1960s, travel on an "air ferry" was possible—airplanes, often ex-military, specially equipped to take a small number of cars in addition to foot passengers. These operated various routes including between the United Kingdom and Continental Europe. Companies operating such services included Channel Air Bridge, Silver City Airways, and Corsair.

The term is also applied to any "ferrying" by air, and is commonly used when referring to airborne military operations.

Docking

Ferries often dock at specialized facilities designed to position the boat for loading and unloading, called a ferry slip. If the ferry transports road vehicles or railway carriages there will usually be an adjustable ramp called an apron that is part of the slip. In other cases, the apron ramp will be a part of the ferry itself, acting as a wave guard when elevated and lowered to meet a fixed ramp at the terminus – a road segment that extends partially underwater or meet the ferry slip.

Records

Gross tonnage
The world's largest ferries are typically those operated in Europe, with different vessels holding the record depending on whether length, gross tonnage or car vehicle capacity is the metric.

Oldest
On 11 October 1811, inventor John Stevens' ship the Juliana, began operation as the first steam-powered ferry (service was between New York City, and Hoboken, New Jersey).

The sole contender as oldest ferry in continuous operation is the Mersey Ferry from Liverpool to Birkenhead, England. In 1150, the Benedictine Priory at Birkenhead was established. The monks used to charge a small fare to row passengers across the estuary as absolute scousers. In 1330, Edward III granted a charter to the Priory and its successors for ever: "the right of ferry there... for men, horses and goods, with leave to charge reasonable tolls". However, there may have been a short break following the Dissolution of the monasteries after 1536.

Largest networks
 Waxholmsbolaget – 21 vessels serving around 300 ports of call in the Stockholm archipelago.
 Istanbul Ferry Network – 87 vessels serving 86 ports of call in and around the Bosporus of Istanbul, Turkey.
 BC Ferries – 36 vessels serving 47 ports of call along the west coast of British Columbia, Canada, carrying 22.3 million passengers annually.
 Caledonian MacBrayne – 31 vessels serving 50 ports of call along the west coast of Scotland, carrying 1.43 million passengers annually.
 Sydney Ferries – 31 vessels serving 36 ports of call in Port Jackson (Sydney Harbour), carrying 15.3 million passengers annually.
 Washington State Ferries – 28 vessels serving 20 ports of call around Puget Sound of Washington, United States, carrying 24.2 million passengers annually.
 Metrolink Queensland – 21 vessels serving 26 ports of call along the Brisbane River in Brisbane, Australia, carrying 2.7 million passengers annually.
 Société des traversiers du Québec

Busiest networks
 Washington State Ferries – 24.2 million passengers annually.
 Staten Island Ferry in New York City – 23.9 million passengers annually; busiest single-line ferry in the world.
 Amsterdam GVB Ferries – 22.4 million passengers annually.
 BC Ferries – 22.3 million passengers annually.
 Star Ferry in Hong Kong – 19.7 million passengers annually.

Fastest
It can carry 450 passengers and 52 cars along the  route.

Sustainability 

The contributions of ferry travel to climate change have received less scrutiny than land and air transport, and vary considerably according to factors like speed and the number of passengers carried. Average carbon dioxide emissions by ferries per passenger-kilometre seem to be .

Alternative fuels

With the price of oil at high levels, and with increasing pressure from consumers for measures to tackle global warming, a number of innovations for energy and the environment were put forward at the Interferry conference in Stockholm. According to the company Solar Sailor, hybrid marine power and solar wing technology are suitable for use with ferries, private yachts and even tankers.

Alternative fuels are becoming more widespread on ferries. The fastest passenger ferry in the world Buquebus, runs on LNG, while Sweden's Stena converted one of its ferries to run on both diesel and methanol in 2015. Both LNG and methanol reduce CO2 emissions considerably and replace costly diesel fuel.

Megawatt-class battery electric ferries operate in Scandinavia, with several more scheduled for operation. The ferry weights 8414 tonnes, and has an electric storage capacity of more than 4 MWh.

Since 2015, Norwegian ferry company Norled has operated e-ferry  on the Lavik-Opedal connection on the E39 north of Bergen. Further north on the Norwegian west coast, the connection between Anda and Lote will be the world's first route served only by e-ferries. The first of two ships, MF Gloppefjord, was put into service in January 2018, followed by MF Eidsfjord. The owner, Fjord1, has commissioned a further seven battery-powered ferries to be in operation from 2020. A total of 60 battery powered car ferries are expected to be operational in Norway by 2021.

Since 15 August 2019, Ærø Municipality have operated  between the southern Danish ports of Fynshav and Søby, on the island of Ærø. It will now need to prove it can provide up to seven return trips per day. The European Union, which supported the project, aims to roll out 100 or more of these ferries by 2030.

Accidents 
The following notable maritime disasters involved ferries.

  – 852 deaths
  – 193 deaths
  – 159 deaths
  – 4,386 deaths
  - 1,863 deaths
 MV Namyoug-Ho 323–326 deaths
 MV Seohae 292 deaths
 MV Sewol – 304 deaths
  – 53 deaths
 Greycliffe disaster – 40 deaths

See also

 Chain boat
 Ferry slip 
 Linkspan
 List of ferry operators
 Punt (boat)
 Pünte
 Sea tractor
 Team boat
 Transporter bridge
 Merchant Vessel

References

Notes

Bibliography

 
 
 "When Horses Walked on Water: Horse-Powered Ferries in Nineteenth-Century America" (Smithsonian Institution Press; Kevin Crisman, co-authored with Arthur Cohn, executive director of the Lake Champlain Maritime Museum).

External links

 "Off Ferries, New And Old", May 1931, Popular Science
 Photography of European locations visitable by ferry
 

Boat types
 
 
Ship types